Ali Soilih M'Tsashiwa (January 7, 1937 – May 29, 1978) was a Comorian socialist revolutionary and political figure who served as the 3rd President of the Comoros from 3 January 1976 to 13 May 1978.

Biography
Soilih was born in Majunga, Madagascar. He spent much of his early life there, and was educated in Madagascar and France. During the early 1960s, he traveled to Comoros, where he worked in agriculture and economic development.

Rise to power
In 1970, Ali Soilih entered politics as a supporter of Said Ibrahim, leader of the Democratic Assembly of the Comoran People, Rassemblement démocratique du Peuple Comorien (RDPC). He soon developed an ideology of hostility towards France as the former colonial power. His ideas were socialist, and he renounced his Islamic faith and became an atheist.

On August 3, 1975, less than a month after Comoros gained independence from France, Soilih overthrew President Said Mohamed Jaffar and became head of a revolutionary council that took over Comoros. Soilih, whose adherents were barely armed, hired French mercenary Bob Denard to overthrow Ahmed Abdallah. He officially became President of the revolutionary council in January 1976. He acquired extensive powers under the terms of a new constitution and implemented socialist economic policies. In 1977 he held a referendum on his presidency, with 56.63% of voters endorsing it.

Revolutionary program
Soilih embarked on a revolutionary program that was mainly directed against the country's traditional Muslim society. His vision, based on a mixture of Maoism and Islamic philosophies, was to develop the Comoros as an economically self-sufficient and ideologically progressive modern 20th-century state.

Condemned as wasteful and cumbersome, certain inherited customs of Comorian culture were abolished, like the 'Anda', the traditional "grand marriage", as well as traditional funerary ceremonies, which were criticized for being too costly. Soilih advanced the cause of the youth by discouraging the study of history and allowing young people to take more power. In order to reach his goal, he lowered the voting age to fourteen and put teenagers in positions of responsibility. Among the most striking of his reforms were measures designed to gain the favor of the youth, like the legalization of cannabis and promoting the removal of the veil among the women of Comoros.

Soilih created the 'Moissy', a young revolutionary militia trained by Tanzanian military advisers. The Moissy was a Comorian version of Mao Zedong's Red Guards, and its methods were similar to those that had been employed by their Chinese counterpart during the Cultural Revolution.

Consequences
As a result of Soilih's confrontational policies, France, the former colonial power in the islands, terminated all aid and technical assistance programs to Comoros. The teenage Moissy were viewed by the Comorian people as a repressive political police, and their intimidation tactics and often random and chaotic activity caused widespread resentment among the Comorian population. The teenage Moissy were armed with AK-47 assault rifles and behaved with outrageous arrogance, raping any women who resisted their advances and killing anyone who questioned their authority in the slightest. The commander of the Moissy was a 15-year-old, chosen only for his loyalty to the president. The humiliation of Comorian people at the hands of the Moissy and the undermining of their authority alienated the traditional leaders of the Comoros who resented the progressive elimination of age-old traditions. Growing discontent promoted by the political opposition resulted in four unsuccessful coup attempts against the Soilih regime during its two-and-a-half-year existence.

On May 13, 1978, Soilih was finally overthrown by a force of 50 mercenaries, largely former French paratroopers hired by exiled former leader Ahmed Abdallah and led by French Colonel Bob Denard. The Moissy were worthless as soldiers and the French mercenaries almost effortlessly annihilated the Moissy in a few hours of fighting as the untrained and undisciplined rabble of the Moissy, who had never seen action before, were no match for the well-trained and experienced French mercenaries, most of whom were veterans of the elite Parachute units. In a few hours of fighting, the French killed hundreds of the Moissy without losing a single man in return. On the night of the coup, Soilih was discovered by Denard, who had kicked in the door to his bedroom, naked in his bed with three nude teenage schoolgirls, all of them high on marijuana watching a pornographic film. Denard recalled that Soilih was so stupid and high that he had to repeat several times his message that he was no longer president before Soilih finally realized he was now deposed. Abdallah became president, Soilih's policies were reversed, and the name of the country was changed to "Islamic Federal Republic of the Comoros". On May 29, Soilih was shot and killed; according to the government, he had attempted to escape from house arrest.

Aftermath
More than 10 years later, in 1989, Soilih's older half-brother, Said Mohamed Djohar, overthrew Abdallah, possibly with the help of Denard. He served as president of Comoros until 1996.

The effects of the social policies of Ali Soilih are still apparent in the Comoros, particularly on Anjouan.

See also
 List of heads of state of the Comoros

References

1937 births
1978 deaths
Presidents of the Comoros
Foreign ministers of the Comoros
Comorian socialists
Assassinated Comorian politicians
Assassinated heads of state
Deaths by firearm in the Comoros
People murdered in the Comoros
Malagasy emigrants to the Comoros
Malagasy people murdered abroad
Assassinated heads of government
Leaders who took power by coup
Leaders ousted by a coup
Heads of government who were later imprisoned
Malagasy people of Comorian descent